Kharun Umarovich Bogatyrev (15 September 1907 – 10 July 1966) was the deputy commander of the 51st Guards Tank Brigade and later the commander of the 52nd Guards Tank Brigade of the Red Army during the Second World War. For his success during the Battle of the Dnieper he was awarded the title Hero of the Soviet Union, despite his first nomination for the title being rejected because of his Karachay ethnicity. He was the first Karachay awarded the title.

References

 
1907 births 
1966 deaths 
Heroes of the Soviet Union 
Recipients of the Order of Lenin 
Recipients of the Order of the Red Banner
Recipients of the Order of Alexander Nevsky